Pilocosta is a genus of flowering plants belonging to the family Melastomataceae. Its native range is Costa Rica to Ecuador.

Species:

Pilocosta campanensis 
Pilocosta erythrophylla 
Pilocosta nana 
Pilocosta nubicola 
Pilocosta oerstedii

References 

Melastomataceae
Melastomataceae genera